David W. Rollason is an English historian and medievalist. He is a Professor in history at Durham University. He specialises in the cult of saints in Anglo-Saxon England, the history of Northumbria and in the historical writings of Durham, most notably producing a modern edition and translation of the Libellus de exordio and co-operating on an edition of the Durham Liber Vitae.

Outside of his academic interests, David Rollason is a keen cyclist, cycling 175 miles from Edinburgh to Seaton Delaval to raise money to assist the National Trust in their purchase of Seaton Delaval Hall.

Selected publications
 The Mildrith Legend: A Study in Early Medieval Hagiography in England, (1982)
 ed. with G. Bonner and C. Stancliffe St Cuthbert, his Cult and his Community to AD 1200, (1989)
 Saints and Relics in Anglo-Saxon England, (1989)
 with D. Gore & G. Fellows-Jensen, Sources for York History to AD 1100, (York, 1998)
 ed. & tr. Symeon of Durham. Libellus de exordio atque procursu istius, hoc est Dunhelmensis, ecclesie, (Oxford, 2000)
 Bede and Germany, (Jarrow Lecture, 2002)
 Northumbria 500-1100: Creation and Destruction of a Kingdom, (Cambridge, 2003) .
 ed. with many others, The Durham Liber Vitae. British Library, MS Domitian A.VII, An Edition with Digital Facsimile, and Prosopographical and Linguistic Commentaries, (British Library, 2007)
 (Forthcoming in 2011) Early Medieval Europe 300-1050: The Birth of Western Society

References

Sources
 

Academics of Durham University
British medievalists
English historians
Living people
Year of birth missing (living people)
Anglo-Saxon studies scholars